Charles Chris Hagemeister (August 21, 1946 – May 19, 2021) was a United States Army officer and a recipient of the United States military's highest decoration, the Medal of Honor, for his actions in the Vietnam War.

Early life
Hagemeister was born in Lincoln, Nebraska, on August 21, 1946.  He was the youngest of four siblings in his family.  He attended Lincoln Southeast High School, before studying at the University of Nebraska–Lincoln.

Vietnam War
Hagemeister was drafted into the United States Army from his birth city of Lincoln, Nebraska, in May 1966, during a break from his university studies.  By March 20 of the following year, he was serving as a specialist four in Headquarters and Headquarters Company, 1st Battalion, 5th Cavalry Regiment, 1st Cavalry Division (Air mobile). He was previously serving as a medic. During a firefight on that day, in Binh Dinh Province, Republic of Vietnam, Hagemeister repeatedly exposed himself to enemy fire in order to aid wounded comrades. He was subsequently promoted to specialist five and awarded the Medal of Honor for his actions.

Post-war life
Upon his return from military service, Hagemeister became a commissioned officer.  He reached the rank of lieutenant colonel before retiring in June 1990.  He also served on the board of the Congressional Medal of Honor Society.

Personal life
Hagemeister was married to Barbara until his death.  Together, they had two children.

Hagemeister died on May 19, 2021, at Saint John Hospital in Leavenworth, Kansas.  He was 74, and was one of only two surviving Medal of Honor recipients from Nebraska (the other being Bob Kerrey). He is buried at Leavenworth National Cemetery.

Medal of Honor citation

Specialist Hagemeister's Medal of Honor citation reads:

See also

List of Medal of Honor recipients for the Vietnam War

References

1946 births
2021 deaths
United States Army personnel of the Vietnam War
United States Army Medal of Honor recipients
People from Lincoln, Nebraska
Military personnel from Nebraska
United States Army colonels
Vietnam War recipients of the Medal of Honor
Combat medics